Camila de Queiroz Toledo (née Tavares; born 27 June 1993) is a Brazilian actress and model. She is known for her role as Angel in the International Emmy Award-winning telenovela Verdades Secretas.

Biography
Camila was born in Ribeirão Preto, São Paulo. From a humble family, her mother is a manicurist, and her father is a carpenter. Camila has two sisters (Caroline and Melina Queiroz), being the middle daughter.

Career

2007–2014: Modeling career
During the age of 14, she has been living alone in São Paulo, after winning the contest Pernambucanas Faces in the national phase and signed a contract with Ford Models. At the age of 16, she was living in Japan contracted by a local agency. At the age of 18, she moved to New York City continuing her modeling career, where she participated in international campaigns such as Armani Exchange brand.

2015–present
Queiroz lived in the United States for three years. When she was 21, she was invited to audition for a telenovela by Walcyr Carrasco, Verdades Secretas. She was cast as Angel / Arlete, a young naive girl that has the dream of being a rich and successful model, but ends up working as a high class prostitute. Being her acting debut, she received praise from viewers and critics alike and won numerous award for her performance as the protagonist of the series. She also debuted as a host of the end-year special, Festeja Brasil, alongside Márcio Garcia.

In 2016, she returned to work with Carrasco, in Êta Mundo Bom!, playing the naïve Mafalda. Where she lived a love square with Klebber Toledo, Anderson Di Rizzi and Juliane Araújo. In 2017, she starred in Pega Pega, a romantic comedy by Claudia Souto.

Personal life
Between 2013 and 2016 she dated model Lucas Cattani.

In August 2016 she took up a relationship with actor Klebber Toledo, during a trip together in Bariloche, Argentina. In June 2017 they became engaged. In August 2018, they were married at a religious ceremony at the Essenza Hotel in Jericoacoara, Ceará, Brazil.

Filmography

Awards and nominations

References

External links

 

1993 births
Living people
Actresses from São Paulo (state)
Brazilian female models
Brazilian telenovela actresses
21st-century Brazilian actresses
People from Ribeirão Preto